Henry Short may refer to:
 Henry Short (cricketer)
 Henry Short (editor)